The 2021–22 season was the 92nd season in the existence of Girona FC and the club's third consecutive season in the second division of Spanish football. In addition to the domestic league, Girona participated in this season's edition of the Copa del Rey.

Girona finished in 6th place to earn a play-off spot. They beat Eibar and Tenerife on the road to return to La Liga after three years.

Players

First-team squad

Reserve team

Out on loan

Transfers

In

Out

Pre-season and friendlies

Competitions

Overall record

Segunda División

League table

Results summary

Results by round

Matches
The league fixtures were announced on 30 June 2021.

Promotion play-offs

Copa del Rey

Statistics

Goalscorers

References

Girona FC seasons
Girona
Girona